Alegre is a municipality located in the Brazilian state of Espírito Santo. Its population was 29,975 (2020) and its area is 772 km² (298 sq mi).

The municipality contains the Cachoeira da Fumaça State Park, created in 1984.

Gallery

References

Municipalities in Espírito Santo